The 2011 Kumho V8 Touring Car Series was an Australian motor racing series for V8 Touring Cars, which are de-registered and superseded former V8 Supercars. Although the series utilised cars built for V8 Supercar racing, it was not an official V8 Supercar series.

It was the fourth running of the V8 Touring Car National Series. The series took place on the program of Shannons Nationals Motor Racing Championships events. It began at Wakefield Park on 1 April and finished at Phillip Island Grand Prix Circuit on 6 November after five meetings held in New South Wales, Victoria and South Australia.

Terry Wyhoon, driving a Ford Falcon, won the series by 72 points, having won ten of the fifteen races and two of the five rounds. Scott Loadsman finished second, 117 points ahead of Chris Smerdon who led the series after four rounds but was disqualified from Sandown for eligibility problems. Justin Garioch finished fourth despite missing a round, 31 points behind Smerdon and 13 points ahead of Jim Pollicina in fifth.

Calendar

The 2011 Kumho V8 Touring Car Series was contested over five rounds held across three states.

Points System

The following points system was used for 2011:

The only change from 2010 was that "Time Attack" was formalised for the ten fastest qualifying cars only, with the pointscore beginning at ten points for fastest.

Teams and drivers

The following teams and drivers competed in the 2011 Kumho V8 Touring Car Series.

Driver standings

Notes:

† – During Race 1 of Round 5 at Phillip Island, Aaron Tebb's Holden Commodore made heavy contact with the wall with two laps to go, leading to the race being red flagged and the results backdated.

See also
2011 V8 Supercar season

External links
 Official series website

References

Kumho V8 Touring Car Series
V8 Touring Car Series